Happy Jail is a documentary streaming television series. The premise revolves around an ex-convict becoming the manager of the Philippine jail CPDRC in Cebu province known for a viral Michael Jackson dance video in 2007.

Release
Happy Jail was released on August 14, 2019, on Netflix.

Episodes

References

External links
 
 

Netflix original documentary television series
2010s American documentary television series